Cabanis's ground sparrow or Costa Rican ground sparrow (Melozone cabanisi), is an American sparrow. It previously was considered a subspecies of the Prevost's ground sparrow. 

Cabanis's ground sparrow is endemic to central Costa Rica. It is ranked as "Near Threatened" by the IUCN due to its small range most of which has been deforested for centuries. The species has adapted well to secondary habitats and coffee plantations, and should not be considered at risk.

Description
It is on average 15 cm long and weighs 28 g. The adult has a stubby dark-grey bill, unstreaked olive-brown upperparts, a rufous crown and mainly white underparts. Young birds are browner above, have yellower underparts, and a duller indistinct head pattern. The rufous of the crown extends to behind the eye and is bordered on its anterior edge with black. This black border is broken by a white eye ring. The forehead is white, bordered below with a thin black line; there is a black malar stripe, and a black central breast patch.

References

Stiles and Skutch, A guide to the birds of Costa Rica, 

Cabanis's ground sparrow
Birds of Costa Rica
Endemic fauna of Costa Rica
Cabanis's ground sparrow
Cabanis's ground sparrow
Cabanis's ground sparrow